The thirtieth series of the British television drama series Grange Hill began broadcasting on 16 January 2007, before ending on 22 March 2007 on the CBBC Channel. The series follows the lives of the staff and pupils of the eponymous school, an inner-city London comprehensive school. It consists of twenty episodes.

Cast

Pupils

Teachers

Others

Episodes

DVD release
The thirtieth series of Grange Hill has never been released on DVD as of 2014.

Notes

References

2007 British television seasons
Grange Hill